John Elmer Blaha (born August 26, 1942, in San Antonio, Texas) is a retired United States Air Force colonel and a former NASA astronaut. He is a veteran of five space missions aboard the Space Shuttle and Mir.

Blaha is married to the former Brenda I. Walters of St. Louis, Missouri. They have three grown children and five grandchildren.

Education
Blaha graduated from Granby High School in Norfolk, Virginia, in 1960; received a Bachelor of Science in engineering science from the United States Air Force Academy in 1965; and received a Master of Science in astronautical engineering from Purdue University in 1966.

Air Force service
Blaha received his pilot wings at Williams Air Force Base, Arizona, in 1967. He was subsequently assigned as an operational pilot flying F-4, F-102, F-106, and A-37 aircraft (completing 361 combat missions in Vietnam). He attended the USAF Aerospace Research Pilot School at Edwards Air Force Base, California, in 1971, and piloted the NF-104 research aircraft to 104,400 feet. Following graduation, he served as an F-104 instructor pilot at the test pilot school, teaching low lift-to-drag approach, zoom, performance, stability/control, and spin flight test techniques. In 1973, he was assigned as a test pilot working with the Royal Air Force at the Aeroplane and Armament Experimental Establishment, Boscombe Down, United Kingdom. During a three-year tour, he flew stability/control, performance, spin, and weapons delivery flight tests in the SEPECAT Jaguar, Blackburn Buccaneer, BAE Hawk, and BAC Jet Provost aircraft. In 1976, he attended the U.S. Air Force Air Command and Staff College. After graduation, he was assigned to work for the Assistant Chief of Staff, Studies and Analyses, at Headquarters USAF in the Pentagon. During this tour, he presented F-15 Eagle and F-16 Fighting Falcon study results to Department of Defense, State Department, and Congressional staffs.

NASA

Selected as an astronaut in May 1980, Blaha has logged 161 days in space on five space missions. He served as pilot on STS-33 and STS-29, was spacecraft Commander on STS-58 and STS-43, served on Mir 22 as Board Engineer 2, and was a mission specialist on STS-79 and STS-81.

In addition to flying five space missions, Blaha has served as the chairman, NASA Space Flight Safety Panel; weather manager, Mission Management Team; lead spacecraft communicator; member, NASA Space Shuttle Improvement Panel. Blaha also led the design, development, and integration of the Orbiter Head Up Display system. Additionally, he led the development of contingency abort procedures which significantly improve crew survivability in the event of multiple main engine failures during ascent. He has logged more than 7,000 hours of flying time in 34 different aircraft, and has written numerous technical articles on spacecraft performance and control.

Blaha retired from NASA in September 1997 to return to his hometown of San Antonio, Texas, where he joined the executive management team of the United Services Automobile Association.

Space flights
STS-29 Discovery launched from Kennedy Space Center, Florida, on March 13, 1989, and landed at Edwards Air Force Base on March 18, 1989. During this successful mission the five-man crew aboard Shuttle Discovery deployed the East Tracking and Data Relay Satellite, and performed eight scientific/medical experiments.

STS-33 Discovery (November 22–27, 1989). Launched at night, this five-day mission carried Department of Defense payloads and other secondary payloads. After 79 orbits of the Earth, this highly successful mission concluded with a hard surface landing on Runway 4 at Edwards Air Force Base, California.

STS-43 Atlantis (August 2–11, 1991) launched from the Kennedy Space Center carrying a five-person crew. During the nine-day mission the crew deployed the West Tracking and Data Relay Satellite, and conducted 32 physical, material, and life science experiments that supported the development of the Extended Duration Orbiter and Space Station. After 142 orbits of the Earth, this very significant mission concluded with a landing on Runway 15 at the Kennedy Space Center, Florida.

STS-58 Columbia (October 18 to November 1, 1993) launched from the Kennedy Space Center carrying a seven-person crew. This record duration fourteen-day life science research mission has been recognized by NASA management as the most successful and efficient Spacelab flight that NASA has flown. The crew performed neurovestibular, cardiovascular, cardiopulmonary, metabolic, and musculoskeletal medical experiments on themselves and 48 rats, expanding our knowledge of human and animal physiology both on Earth and in space flight. In addition, the crew performed 16 engineering tests aboard the Orbiter Columbia and 20 Extended Duration Orbiter Medical Project experiments. Landing was at Edwards Air Force Base on Runway 22.

Blaha began Russian language training in August 1994 at the Defense Language Institute in Monterey, California, and commenced an intensive training program at the Gagarin Cosmonaut Training Center, Star City, Russia in January 1995. He launched on STS-79 on September 16, 1996. After docking he transferred to the Mir Space Station. Assigned as a Board Engineer 2, he spent the following 4 months with the Mir 22 Cosmonaut crew conducting material science, fluid science, and life science research. Blaha returned to Earth aboard STS-81 on January 22, 1997.

Blaha was not permitted to vote in the November 1996 election, because his mission on Mir began before ballots were finalized, and lasted beyond Election Day. In 1997, Texas amended its election statutes to permit voting from outer space, as a result of his predicament.

Honors
Defense Superior Service Medal
Legion of Merit
Distinguished Flying Crosses (two)
Defense Meritorious Service Medal
Meritorious Service Medals (three)
Air Medals (18)
Air Force Commendation Medal
NASA Distinguished Service Medals (two)
NASA Outstanding Leadership Medal
NASA Exceptional Service Medal
NASA Space Flight Medals (five)
Air Force Cross (United Kingdom)
Russian Order of Friendship
Vietnam Cross of Gallantry
Purdue Outstanding Aerospace Engineer Award
Purdue Engineering Alumnus Award
Outstanding Pilot, F-4 Combat Crew Training
Outstanding Junior Officer of the Year, 3d Tactical Fighter Wing
Distinguished Graduate U.S. Air Force Test Pilot School
Distinguished Graduate Air Command and Staff College
Countdown Magazine Outstanding Astronaut of 1991
University Roundtable Annual Best and Brightest Award
Name given to minor planet 22442 Blaha
Grand Marshal Fiesta Flambeau Parade
Grand Marshal Battle of Flowers Parade
Granby High School Hall of Fame
Astronaut Hall of Fame (May 2008).

References

External links

Spacefacts biography of John E. Blaha

1942 births
Living people
United States Air Force astronauts
United States Astronaut Hall of Fame inductees
Military personnel from San Antonio
United States Air Force Academy alumni
Purdue University School of Aeronautics and Astronautics alumni
U.S. Air Force Test Pilot School alumni
United States Air Force colonels
American test pilots
Aviators from Texas
United States Air Force personnel of the Vietnam War
Recipients of the Legion of Merit
Recipients of the Distinguished Flying Cross (United States)
Recipients of the Air Medal
Recipients of the Defense Superior Service Medal
Recipients of the Gallantry Cross (Vietnam)
Recipients of the Air Force Cross (United Kingdom)
Recipients of the NASA Distinguished Service Medal
Recipients of the NASA Exceptional Service Medal
American people of Czech descent
Amateur radio people
Space Shuttle program astronauts
Recipients of the Meritorious Service Medal (United States)
Mir crew members